The following is a calendar of lesbian, gay, bisexual, and transgender (LGBT) events. This mainly comprises pride parades but also includes other kinds of events such as sporting events and film festivals. The world's largest pride parades include those in New York City and São Paulo, each with millions of participants in attendance annually in June. Other Pride parades include those in Toronto and Tokyo.

Worldwide

Africa

Asia

Europe

North America

Oceania

South America

See also 

List of largest LGBT events
List of LGBT awareness periods

Pride parades
 EuroPride
 Gay pride
 LGBT pride parade
 List of largest LGBT events
 List of LGBT awareness days
 WorldPride

Lists of articles about LGBT events 
 All events
 All events by country
 Awareness days
 Bear events
 Beauty pageants
 Circuit parties
 Film festivals
 Music events
 Pride parades
 Sport events

References

External links